Baiyoke Tower II is an 88-story,  skyscraper hotel at 222 Ratchaprarop Road in the Ratchathewi District of Bangkok, Thailand. It is the fourth tallest building in the city, after MahaNakhon and Magnolias Waterfront Residences at ICONSIAM. The building comprises the Baiyoke Sky Hotel, the tallest hotel in Southeast Asia and the seventh-tallest all-hotel structure in the world.

Construction on the building ended in 1997, with the antenna being added two years later.

Gallery

See also
List of tallest buildings in Bangkok
List of tallest buildings in Thailand

Sources 
 Engineering News Record Magazine (June '96) International Construction Magazine (Nov '94) 
 Civil Engineering International (May '96) 
 Engineers Australia Magazine (Oct '96)
 VSL News (1994)
 Bangkok Post Archive

References

External links

Baiyoke Sky Hotel Official Site
Plan Architect Co.
Baiyoke Sky Hotel Photos
Bangkok Highrises
Big panorama view from Baiyoke Towers

Hotels in Bangkok
Tourist attractions in Bangkok
Skyscrapers in Bangkok
Ratchathewi district
Hotel buildings completed in 1997
Hotels established in 1997
1997 establishments in Thailand
Retail buildings in Thailand
Skyscraper hotels in Thailand